Let 'Em Eat Cake is a 1933 Broadway musical with music by George Gershwin, lyrics by Ira Gershwin, and book by George S. Kaufman and Morrie Ryskind. It is the sequel to the Pulitzer prize-winning Of Thee I Sing and had the same producer, writers, and stars. However, the tone of Let 'Em Eat Cake was much darker and the issues more complex: President Wintergreen is defeated for reelection, and he and his former Vice President, Alexander Throttlebottom, form an incipient Fascist movement to take over the government.

Productions
The original Broadway production of Let 'Em Eat Cake opened October 21, 1933 at the Imperial Theatre, New York City, USA and ran for 89 performances.  The cast included William Gaxton as J.P. Wintergreen, Victor Moore as Alexander Throttlebottom, Philip Loeb as Kruger, and Lois Moran as Mary Wintergreen.  The no longer extant orchestrations were by Edward B. Powell.

The show carried a message that audiences did not want to hear and it was a failure.  However, it did have one song: "Mine".  Several musical themes from Of Thee I Sing are reused in Let 'Em Eat Cake, including the Supreme Court Judges' song and the campaign song "Wintergreen for President", which includes parts of folk and patriotic songs such as Sousa's "Stars and Stripes Forever", and "Hail, Hail, the Gang's All Here."

A concert version of the show was performed on BBC Radio in 1994 (with a cast that included: Denis Quilley, Kim Criswell, Joss Ackland, Henry Goodman, and Louise Gold), and Opera North staged the show, along with a revival of Of Thee I Sing, during its 2008–9 season.  The Opera North production was broadcast by BBC Radio 3 on Saturday, 26 September 2009, as part of its Opera on 3 series.

Plot

Act I

President Wintergreen is up for reelection, but due to the continuing Great Depression, loses in a landslide to John P. Tweedledee.  Wintergreen makes an unsuccessful appeal to the Supreme Court to overturn the election results.  It is also revealed that Diana Deveraux divorced Throttlebottom to marry the French Ambassador.  After the end of his term, Wintergreen, Throttlebottom, and their associates start a business selling his wife Mary's blue shirts on "Union Square."  At Union Square, Kruger, an agitator, is proclaiming his doctrine "Down with Everything That's Up."  After talking with Kruger, Wintergreen decides that to increase shirt sales they should promise a revolution or their money back, citing the European Brown Shirts and Black Shirts. With business now booming ("Shirts by Millions"), Mary appeals to the women to join the New Blue D.A.R. ("Climb up the Social Ladder") to increase female shirt sales.  Wintergreen now needs the support of the Union League Club, because General Snookfield is a member. Throttlebottom persuades them by saying that the British are attacking Bunker Hill ("Comes the Revolution Reprise").   Having secured the Union League Club support, The Blue Shirts meet with Snookfield to plan the overthrow of the government ("On and On and On").  At nine o'clock on July 4, when the Blue Shirts arrive, Snookfield will give the signal for his soldiers to seize Tweedledee.  On the Fourth, at the White House grounds,  Tweedledee is giving a speech, when Snookfield leaves with Trixie for a party.  The Blue Shirts arrive only to find the general is missing and the soldiers don't know what to do.  Tweedledee promises the army a "dollar a day which (he) may not pay."  Wintergreen  promises the army the war debts owed by the League of Nations, which the soldiers accept.  Tweedledee is deposed, and Wintergreen declares that "the land of freedom is free once more" ("Let 'Em Eat Cake").

Act II

The White House is being painted "Blue, Blue, Blue."  The Supreme Court, now in chains, are brought before Wintergreen.  He decides to show leniency because the Court officiated his marriage ceremony.  The Court is reorganized into a baseball team.  When the League of Nations arrives to discuss repayment of the war debts, they "No Comprenez, No Capish, No Versteh" when the issue is raised; only Finland repays their debt.  Kruger, now head of the army following Snookfield's disgrace, is also putting pressure on Wintergreen to remember his promise.  Wintergreen offers a solution where the debts will be settled by a baseball game for double or nothing.  If the League loses, they will have another conference to discuss it.  Kruger accepts the League's offer of Finland's money as a side bet.  Throttlebottom hesitatingly accepts an offer to be the game's umpire.  On the date of the ballgame the Supreme Ball Players, the League, and Kruger's army try to influence Throttlebottom to bend the rules their way. 
 
The United States loses the game after a controversial call by umpire Throttlebottom.  The soldiers want someone to be held to account for the loss, over Wintergreen and his associates' objections ("Oyez, Oyez, Oyez").  In the "Trial of Throttlebottom" a military tribunal is underway.  Kruger, the Army, and the Ball Players call for Throttlebottom's execution claiming he conspired with the enemy.  Wintergreen and his associates object, until the army levels the guns at them.  Kruger and the army want to know when they are going be paid ("A Hell of a Hole").  After Wintergreen offers them a share of the shirt business, the army is going to take it all (Down With Everything That's Up—Reprise).  Despite pleading he tried his best to get the money ("It Isn't What You Did"),  Kruger sentences Wintergreen and his cronies to death by beheading.  Mary and the condemned's wives enter and proclaim they are pregnant.  Kruger says this may have worked four years ago during Wintergreen's impeachment hearings, but it doesn't work with the army.   Trixie, who controls the Navy, arrives and joins forces with Kruger ("First Lady and First Gent").  Kruger proclaims "Let 'em Eat Caviar."

Execution day arrives, and in their jail cell Wintergreen, Throttlebotton, and the Committee discuss how they ended up in this situation.  Next, the crowds gather to watch the executions ("Hanging Throttlebottom in the Morning").  A guillotine bought from France is unveiled, and Snookfield is shown to be the executioner.  Since Throttlebottom is not married, he will be executed first. After a series of mishaps with the guillotine, Mary interrupts the proceedings.  She presents a "Fashion Show" with dresses that arrived on the boat that brought the guillotine.  After being reminded that the color of the revolution is blue, and they cannot wear the new fashions, the women revolt.  Kruger objects, but the soldiers seize him after Trixie reminds them of an upcoming party.

Wintergreen tells the soldiers to shoot Kruger. When Kruger reveals he used to be in the dress making business, Wintergreen decides to go into business with him.  Wintergreen decides to leave the revolution business and restores the republic and the Supreme Court.  Tweedledee shows up and Wintergreen gives his vice-president, Throttlebottom, to him, since he can't remember his. Tweedledee declines the Presidency, since he is going to be President of Cuba.  Throttlebottom is now the President.  After Wintergreen promised the people cake and Kruger promised them caviar, Throttlebottom promises them pistachio ice cream, which he formerly detested.

Songs

Act I
 Overture - Orchestra
 Opening Act 1
 Wintergreen for President - Ensemble
 Tweedledee for President - Ensemble
 Union Square Scene
 Union Square - Ensemble
 Down With Everyone Who's Up - Kruger and Agitators
 Store Scene
 Shirts by Millions - Wives and Ensemble
 Comes the Revolution - Alexander Throttlebottom and Ensemble
 Mine - John P. Wintergreen, Mary Wintergreen and Ensemble
 Climb Up the Social Ladder - Mary Wintergreen, Wives and Ensemble
 Cloistered from the Noisy City (The Union League) - President of the Union League Club and Club Members
 Comes the Revolution (Reprise) - Union League Club
 On and On and On - John P. Wintergreen, John P. Wintergreen, Mary Wintergreen, Mary Wintergreen, Company and Company
 Finale Act 1
 I've Brushed My Teeth - Gen. Adam Snookfield, U.S.A. and Dignitaries
 On and On and On (Reprise) - Blue Shirts
 The General's Gone to a Party - John P. Tweedledee, John P. Wintergreen, Lieutenant and Men
 All the Mothers of the Nation - Mary Wintergreen, Wives and Girls
 Yes, He's a Bachelor - John P. Wintergreen, Blue Shirts and Lieutenant
 There's Something We're Worried About - Lieutenant, Army, Women, John P. Tweedledee and Kruger
 What's the Proletariat? - Mary Wintergreen, Wives, Committee, Army and All
 Let 'Em Eat Cake - John P. Wintergreen and Company

Act II
 Opening Act 2
 Blue, Blue, Blue - Wives and Ensemble
 Who's the Greatest? - John P. Wintergreen and Ensemble
 The League of Nations
 No Comprenez, No Capish - League of Nations, John P. Wintergreen, Mary Wintergreen and Ensemble
 Who's the Greatest? (Reprise) - John P. Wintergreen and Ensemble
 Ball Park Scene
 Play Ball - Girls
 When the Judges Doff the Ermine - President of the Union League Club and Blue Shirts
 Up and at 'em - Ensemble
 Oyez, Oyez, Oyez - Soldiers and Spectators
 Trial of Throttlebottom
 That's What He Did - Alexander Throttlebottom, Kruger and Ensemble
 I Know a Foul Ball - Alexander Throttlebottom
 Throttle Throttlebottom - Kruger and Ensemble
 Trial of Wintergreen
 A Hell of a Hole (A Hell of a Fix) - John P. Wintergreen, Kruger and Soldiers
 Down With Everyone Who's Up (Reprise) - Kruger and Ensemble
 It Isn't What You Did - John P. Wintergreen and Ensemble
 Mine (Reprise) - John P. Wintergreen, Mary Wintergreen and Ensemble
 Let 'Em Eat Caviar - Kruger and Ensemble (music missing)
 First Lady and First Gent - cut - replaces Caviar in modern performances
 Hang Throttlebottom in the Morning - Lieutenant and Ensemble
 Fashion Show - Ensemble
 Finale (Reprise of either Let 'Em Eat Cake or Of Thee I Sing) - Ensemble

External links
 
 Let 'Em Eat Cake at Ovrtur.com
 Let 'Em Eat Cake at the Music Theatre International website

1933 musicals
Broadway musicals
Musicals about the Great Depression
Plays by George S. Kaufman
Sequel plays
Musicals by George and Ira Gershwin